Die Dame im Chinchilla (published in 1961) is a detective fiction novel written by Frank Arnau. It was translated into Dutch as De vrouw in chinchilla.

Plot summary
The body of a murdered woman is discovered in a New York apartment. Her luxurious bedroom has been thoroughly searched, and expensive clothes are lying around. Chief Inspector David Brewer knows that the victim lived on the edge of legality: in a previous life, she was a stripper and the owner of a night club that got mentioned in a call-girl scandal and in a case involving hard drugs. All motives are present for murder.

1961 German novels
Novels by Frank Arnau
Novels set in New York City